Kesh Garma (also Romanized as Kesh Garmā) is a village in Chehel Shahid Rural District, in the Central District of Ramsar County, Mazandaran Province, Iran. At the 2006 census, its population was 30, in 9 families.

References 

Populated places in Ramsar County